The Private Opera ,  also known as: 
The Russian Private Opera;  
Moscow Private Russian Opera,; 
Mamontov's Private Russian Opera in Moscow; 
Korotkov's Theatre (1885-1888); 
Vinter's Theatre (1896-1899); 
Private Opera Society (1899-1904); and
Solodovnikov Theatre (from 1895; later used by Zimin opera, Moscow Operetta, and Helikon Opera)

was a private operatic enterprise, a company established in 1885 by Russian industrialist and philanthropist Savva Mamontov, who staged the operas, conducted the orchestra, trained the actors, taught them singing and paid all the expenses.

The company
At first the company was organised in Abramtsevo Estate located north of Moscow. The company  was joined by Feodor Chaliapin in the autumn of 1896 and by Sergei Rachmaninov in the autumn of 1897 who took up the post of assistant conductor.

Later years

In Moscow the opera was located in the house at the Bolshaya Dmitrovskaya street, known as "Solodovnikov Theatre", built in 1894–1895 by Russiant merchant and music lover Gavrila Solodovnikov (1826–1901). Later the house was burned down and the Private Opera moved into the theatre "Paradis"  («Парадиз»), at 19/13, Bolshaya Nikitskaya Street (present-day Mayakovsky Theater).

The repertoire included many operas by foreign composers as well as the following works by Russian composers:
1885 – A Life for the Tsar  by Mikhail Glinka;
1885 – The Snow Maiden by Nikolai Rimsky-Korsakov;
1885 – Rusalka by Alexander Dargomyzhsky;
1886 –  The Stone Guest by Alexander Dargomyzhsky;
1886 –  Rogneda by  Alexander Serov;
1886 –  Prince Igor by Alexander Borodin;
1886 –  The Demon by Anton Rubinstein;
1897 –  Sadko by Nikolai Rimsky-Korsakov – world premiere;
1897 –  Khovanshchina by Modest Mussorgsky;
1898 –  Boris Godunov by Modest Mussorgsky;
1898 –  Mozart and Salieri by Nikolai Rimsky-Korsakov – world premiere;
1898 –  Boyarinya Vera Sheloga by Nikolai Rimsky-Korsakov – world premiere;
1898 –  Judith  by  Alexander Serov; 
1899 –  The Tsar's Bride by Nikolai Rimsky-Korsakov – world premiere;
1899 –  The Maid of Orleans by Pyotr Tchaikovsky;
1900 –  Mazeppa  by Pyotr Tchaikovsky;
1900 –  The Tale of Tsar Saltan... by Nikolai Rimsky-Korsakov – world premiere;
1900 –  Asya by Mikhail Ippolitov-Ivanov;
1901 –  The Merchant Kalashnikov  by Anton Rubinstein;
1902 –  Ruslan and Lyudmila by Mikhail Glinka;
1902 –  Kashchey the Immortal by Nikolai Rimsky-Korsakov – world premiere;
1903 –  Legend About the Great City of Kitezh and the Quiet Lake Svetoyar by Sergei Vasilenko, and other.

Final years

In late 1890s, Mamontov consolidated a large lot of land in central Moscow, across from Theatre Square, for building a large civic center with his opera hall and a luxury hotel. He appointed William Walcot as lead architect, however, in 1899 Mamontov was unjustly arrested and put on trial for embezzlement connected with building of the Yaroslavl railway. The project, known as Hotel Metropol, was completed without theater by Petersburg Insurance Company.

Meanwhile, from 1899 until 1904 the company existed without Mamontov, and changed its name to "Private Opera Society" (Tovarishchestvo chastnoi opery).

See also
Russian opera
Russian opera articles

Bibliography
 Haldey, Olga (2010). Mamontov's Private Opera : the search for modernism in Russian theater . Bloomington: Indiana University Press. .

External links
The Russian Cultural Navigator: THE MOSCOW MEDICI (about Savva Mamontov)
The Russian Cultural Navigator: SAVVA MAMONTOV
Moskva.ru: Bolshaya Dmitrovka and Mamontov's Moscow Private Russian Opera
Chaliapin and Private Russian Opera
Caliber: Savva Mamontov, Serge Diaghilev, and a Rocky Path to Modernism
Rachmaninoff at the Private Opera

Opera houses in Russia
Musical groups established in 1885
1904 disestablishments in the Russian Empire
Russian opera companies
1885 establishments in the Russian Empire